The 1981–82 season was the 36th season of competitive football played by Dinamo Zagreb. Dinamo Zagreb ended up first in the Yugoslav First League and had the highest attendance in the league, in total 510,000 visitors at home (average 30,000 per game) and 316,000 in away matches (average 18,000).

First Federal League

Matches

Classification

Results summary

Yugoslav Cup

Player details

Player statistics

FW = Forward, MF = Midfielder, GK = Goalkeeper, DF = Defender

References

External links
 Dinamo Zagreb official website

1981-82
Yugoslav football clubs 1981–82 season
1981-82